Estolomimus is a genus of longhorn beetles of the subfamily Lamiinae, containing the following species:

 Estolomimus abjunctus Martins & Galileo, 2002
 Estolomimus apicale Martins & Galileo, 1997
 Estolomimus curtus (Breuning, 1940)
 Estolomimus distinctus Martins & Galileo, 1997
 Estolomimus lichenophorus Martins & Galileo, 2002
 Estolomimus maculatus Martins & Galileo, 2002
 Estolomimus marmoratus Breuning, 1940
 Estolomimus pulvereus Martins & Galileo, 1997
 Estolomimus solidus (Breuning, 1940)
 Estolomimus transversus Martins & Galileo, 2002

References

Desmiphorini